Zaur Ismatulayevich Kuramagomedov (born 30 March 1988) is a Russian wrestler who won a bronze medal at the 2012 Summer Olympics in the Greco-Roman 60 kg category.

References

External links

 bio on fila-wrestling.com
 wrestrus.ru

Living people
1988 births
Russian male sport wrestlers
Wrestlers at the 2012 Summer Olympics
Olympic bronze medalists for Russia
Olympic medalists in wrestling
Olympic wrestlers of Russia
Medalists at the 2012 Summer Olympics
World Wrestling Championships medalists
Sportspeople from Kabardino-Balkaria
20th-century Russian people
21st-century Russian people